Kaude Shah (also spelled as Koday Shah or Kode Shah) is a 1953 Indian Punjabi-language film directed by S.P. Bakshi (Shanti Prakash Bakshi). 

The film stars include Daljit, Shyama, Miss Manju, Thakur Ramesh Nagpal, Chand Burqe, Rajni, Jaswant, Kharaiti and Mohan. Sardul Kwatra composed the music with playback singers Shamshad Begum, Talat Mahmood and Rajkumari. The songs of the film became very popular written by Verma Malik.

Music and film songs
(1) Jatta aayi basakhi, faslan di mukk gayi raakhi - (Chorus) by Talat Mahmood, Shaminder, Meena Mangeshkar

(2) Tunka tunka maar meri patli patang, Eidha peela peela rang - Shamshad Begum and others

(3) Aj sohne kapde te chunnu - (Chorus) by Shamshad Begum

(4) Wey mein gal wich pake palla - Shamshad Begum

(5) Zulfan nein khul gaiyyaan - Talat Mahmood, Rajkumari

(6) Chhan chhan kardi  merey sajna di daachi, Mere sajna di daachi badami rang di - Shamshad Begum

(7) Chhad de tu mera dupatta, Sunn wey majhay diya jatta - Shamshad Begum

(8)  Kachchi kali si nazuk dil mera, Koi sun ke aime marore gaya - Shamshad Begum

(9) Haaye o meri majboori - Chorus by Verma Malik and others

(10) Likhya naseeb mera - Rajkumari

References

External links 

1953 films
Punjabi-language Indian films
1950s Punjabi-language films
Indian black-and-white films